Take Me may refer to:

 Take Me (TV series), a 2001 British drama miniseries
 Take Me (film), a 2017 American screwball comedy
 "Take Me" (Aly & AJ song), 2017
 "Take Me" (George Jones song), 1965
 "Take Me" (Korn song), 2016
 "Take Me" (Rüfüs song), 2013
 "Take Me" (Frank Sinatra song), 1942
 "Take Me" (Tiësto song), 2013
 "Take Me" (Lari White song), 1998
 "Take Me", a song on Kiss's 1976 album Rock and Roll Over
 "Take Me", a song on Grand Funk Railroad's 1976 album, Born to Die
 "Take Me", a song on Gotthard's 1992 self-titled debut album
 "Take Me", a song on Papa Roach's 2004 album, Getting Away with Murder
 Take Me, a form of losing chess

See also 
 "Take On Me", a 1984 song by A-ha
 "It Takes Me", a 2021 song by Waylon Reavis and Boom Kitty